United States gubernatorial elections are scheduled to be held on November 7, 2023, in the states of Kentucky, Louisiana, and Mississippi. In addition, special elections may take place (depending on state law) if other gubernatorial seats are vacated. These elections form part of the 2023 United States elections. The last regular gubernatorial elections for all three states were in 2019.

Election predictions

Several sites and individuals published predictions of competitive seats. These predictions looked at factors such as the strength of the incumbent (if the incumbent is running for re-election), the strength of the candidates, and the partisan leanings of the state (reflected in part by the state's Cook Partisan Voting Index rating). The predictions assigned ratings to each seat, with the rating indicating a party's predicted advantage in winning that seat.

Most election predictors use:
 "tossup": no advantage
 "tilt" (used by some predictors): advantage that is not quite as strong as "lean"
 "lean": slight advantage
 "likely": significant, but surmountable, advantage 
 "safe" or "solid": near-certain chance of victory

Race summary

Kentucky

Governor Andy Beshear was elected in 2019 with 49.2% of the vote and is running for re-election to a second term. 

Kentucky attorney general Daniel Cameron, former US Ambassador to the UN Kelly Craft, Kentucky State Auditor Mike Harmon, and Kentucky Commissioner of Agriculture Ryan Quarles are all running for the Republican gubernatorial nomination.

Louisiana

Governor John Bel Edwards was re-elected to a second term in 2019 with 51.3% of the vote. He will be term-limited by the Louisiana Constitution in 2023, and cannot seek reelection for a third consecutive term. 

Louisiana utilizes a jungle primary system. Republican Attorney General Jeff Landry is running. Other potential Republican candidates include U.S. Representative Garret Graves, state senator Sharon Hewitt, and Treasurer John Schroder.

Mississippi

Governor Tate Reeves was elected in 2019 with 51.9% of the vote and is running for re-election to a second term. 

Democrat Brandon Presley, Mississippi Public Service Commissioner for the Northern District, is the presumptive Democratic nominee to challenge Reeves.

See also
 List of elections in 2023

References

 
November 2023 events in the United States